Henri is a crater on Mercury. Its name was adopted by the International Astronomical Union (IAU) on April 24, 2012. Henri is named for American painter Robert Henri.

The craters Anyte and Anguissola lie within Henri.  The smaller but similar crater Lismer is joined to Henri to the northeast.

References